Kevin Eugene Williams (born September 11, 1961) is a retired American professional basketball player. A 6'2" (1.88 m) and 175 lb (79 kg) guard, Williams played college basketball at St. John's University from 1979 to 1983.  He attended Charles Evans Hughes High School. He is also the father of singer/songwriter Skylar Maiko.

Williams was selected with the 22nd pick in the 2nd round (46th overall) by the San Antonio Spurs in the 1983 NBA draft. He played five NBA seasons for 5 different teams; his final NBA season split with the Los Angeles Clippers and New Jersey Nets in 1988–89.

References

External links
 
 Profile at Greek Basket League official website
 Profile at Israeli Basketball Premier League official website

1961 births
Living people
American expatriate basketball people in Greece
American expatriate basketball people in Israel
American men's basketball players
Basketball players from New York City
Bay State Bombardiers players
Capital Region Pontiacs players
Chicago Rockers players
Cleveland Cavaliers players
Columbus Horizon players
Grand Rapids Hoops players
Israeli Basketball Premier League players
Iraklis Thessaloniki B.C. players
La Crosse Catbirds players
Los Angeles Clippers players
Miami Heat expansion draft picks
New Jersey Nets players
Ohio Mixers players
Philippine Basketball Association imports
Point guards
Rapid City Thrillers players
San Antonio Spurs draft picks
San Antonio Spurs players
Seattle SuperSonics players
St. John's Red Storm men's basketball players
Tampa Bay Thrillers players
Tulsa Fast Breakers players
Hapoel Holon players
Shell Turbo Chargers players